25 Training Regiment RLC is a training regiment of the Royal Logistic Corps of the British Army. It is part of the Defence School of Transport, located in Leconfield.

Structure
The regiment comprises two squadrons:
109 Training Squadron
110 Training Squadron

References

Regiments of the Royal Logistic Corps
Military units and formations established in 2003